Rogues' Gallery was a British television series which first aired on ITV between 1968 and 1969, as a self contained six episode story within season one of the ITV Sunday Night Theatre anthology series. It was set around London's Newgate Prison in the 18th century.

Main cast
 Diane Cilento as Lady Sarah Bellasize
 Jim Dale as Lucifer Kane
 John Woodnutt as Doctor Peppercorn
 Sandra Bryant as Molly Socket
 Michael Balfour as Tom Meatyard
 Ann Tirard as Old Bessie
 Danny Sewell as Gideon the Gaoler

References

External links

1960s British drama television series
ITV television dramas
1968 British television series debuts
1969 British television series endings
Television shows produced by Granada Television
English-language television shows
Television series set in the 18th century
Television shows set in London
British prison television series